Kilmarnock and Loudoun may refer to:
 Kilmarnock and Loudoun (district), a defunct  local government district in Scotland
 Kilmarnock and Loudoun (Scottish Parliament constituency)
 Kilmarnock and Loudoun (UK Parliament constituency)